Rising Above (2008) was the second Rising Above professional wrestling pay-per-view (PPV) event produced by Ring of Honor. It took place on November 22, 2008 from the Frontier Fieldhouse in Chicago Ridge, Illinois. It aired on January 16, 2009.

Storylines
Rising Above 2008 featured professional wrestling matches that involved different wrestlers working for the Ring of Honor promotion.  It also involved a match for the Shimmer Championship, the top title in Ring of Honor's then sister promotion Shimmer Women Athletes.

The major feuds leading into the event were those between Austin Aries and Jimmy Jacobs and Nigel McGuinness and Bryan Danielson.  Austin Aries and Jimmy Jacobs began feuding when Aries took Jacobs' kayfabe girlfriend Lacey away from him.  The feud escalated to the point in which it was decided the pair would face each other in an "I Quit" Match.  The Nigel McGuinness and Bryan Danielson feud largely revolved around their very competitive previous matches.  The ROH World Champion Nigel McGuinness also resented the fact that Danielson was considered the 'best wrestler in the world' by many fans, despite the fact that he was the World Champion.

Results

See also
2008 in professional wrestling
List of Ring of Honor pay-per-view events

References

External links
Rising Above at In Demand.com
ROHwrestling.com

Professional wrestling in the Chicago metropolitan area
2000s in Chicago
2008 in Illinois
Events in Chicago
ROH Rising Above
November 2008 events in the United States
2008 in professional wrestling